The Tour of Norway is a road bicycle race held annually in Norway. It is considered as a successor to the stage race Ringerike GP, which is now a one-day race. It was started in 2011 as a result of the heightened interest in cycling in Norway, mainly due to good results of professional cyclists Thor Hushovd and Edvald Boasson Hagen. The race is ranked 2.HC on the UCI Europe Tour, and will become part of the new UCI ProSeries in 2020.

From the 2019 season the race merged with Tour des Fjords to form a new six day stage race that will cover all of the southern counties of Norway; the race had previously only been held in Eastern Norway. The first edition of the new race was held from May 28 until June 2, 2019.

Winners

Classifications
As of the 2018 edition, the jerseys worn by the leaders of the individual classifications are:
  Orange Jersey – Worn by the leader of the general classification.
  Blue Jersey – Worn by the leader of the points classification.
  Polkadot Jersey – Worn by the leader of the climber classification. 
  White Jersey – Worn by the best rider under 23 years of age on the overall classification.

External links

Tour des Fjords and Tour of Norway merge

 
UCI Europe Tour races
Cycle races in Norway
Recurring sporting events established in 2011